Laliberte or Laliberté is a surname of French origin, meaning "freedom".  It may refer to the following people:
Guy Laliberté (born 1959), founder of Cirque du Soleil
David Laliberté (born 1986), Canadian ice hockey player
Patrice Laliberté, Canadian film and television director and screenwriter
Pierre Laliberté, Canadian politician
Rick Laliberte (born 1958), Canadian politician
John Laliberte (born 1983), American ice hockey player
Connie Laliberte, Canadian curler
Janet Arnott (née Laliberte), Canadian curler
Marc Laliberté, CEO of Via Rail Canada

Surnames